Prof. Mustafa Bilgin Ali Djamgoz (born in 1952, Nicosia, Cyprus) is Professor of cancer biology at Imperial College London and chairman of the College of Medicine’s Science Council.

Biography
Djamgoz was born in Nicosia, Cyprus to a Turkish Cypriot family. He emigrated to the United Kingdom in 1970 for his studies. Djamgoz studied at the Imperial College London, where he became a Professor of Neurobiology, and then Professor of Cancer Biology. His scientific consultancies and granting agencies include the Medical Research Council (UK) and the Wellcome Trust. In 2002, Djamgoz established the Pro Cancer Research Fund as a registered charity which runs the Amber Care Centre, which is a drop-in centre for people affected by cancer.

Awards and honours
The Huxley Memorial Medal
The Japanese Government Research Award for Foreign Specialist
The Freedom of the City of London

Publications
Djamgoz has published four books and over 200 primary research papers.

References

External links
Imperial College London: Professor  Mustafa  Djamgoz

Living people
1952 births
People from Nicosia
British people of Turkish Cypriot descent
Academics of Imperial College London
Türk Maarif Koleji alumni
Turkish Cypriot emigrants to the United Kingdom
British medical researchers